The Former Bank of England is a historic building at 13/14 Broad Street in Bristol, England. It was built as the site of a branch of The Bank of England.

It was built in 1844-47 by Charles Robert Cockerell 
with a Doric pseudo-portico of three bays recessed between low pavilions: the attic storey is arcaded with a triangular pediment
.

It has been designated by Historic England as a Grade I listed building.

The building is now used as the Bristol Citizens Advice Bureau.

See also
 Grade I listed buildings in Bristol

References

Grade I listed buildings in Bristol
Grade I listed banks
Commercial buildings completed in 1847
1847 establishments in England
Bank of England
19th-century architecture in the United Kingdom